The William T. and Clara H. Veazie House, near Jerome, Idaho, is a lava rock structure built in 1912. It was listed on the National Register of Historic Places in 1983.

The house was built in 1912 by stonemason Thomas Vipham for farmer William T. and Clara H. Veazie.

It was deemed "architecturally significant as an early example of the use of lava rock for bungalow style houses and for its stone craftsmanship." The nomination states that it "is one of the earliest houses of stone built in Jerome County with features such as the dormer, the inset porch, and massing that place it in the bungalow tradition. At the same time it retains traces of older traditions in its enclosed eaves, flat arches above the windows, and steep roof. It shows excellent craftsmanship."

References

Houses on the National Register of Historic Places in Idaho
Houses completed in 1912
Jerome County, Idaho
Lava rock buildings and structures